Jean-Guy White is a Canadian sculptor and puppet designer/builder.

Movie credits
The Muppet Christmas Carol
Muppet Treasure Island
Muppet*Vision 3-D
Muppet Classic Theater

Television credits
Dinosaurs
Fraggle Rock
The Animal Show
W.I.L.D.
Wilbur

External links
Jean-Guy White's Company

Canadian designers
Puppet designers
Living people
Canadian sculptors
Canadian male sculptors
Year of birth missing (living people)